Nicolas Kiefer was the defending champion but lost in the first round to Patrick Rafter.

Juan Carlos Ferrero won the final 6–2, 3–1 after Marat Safin was forced to retire.

Seeds
A champion seed is indicated in bold text while text in italics indicates the round in which that seed was eliminated.

  Marat Safin (final, retired because of a back injury)
  Magnus Norman (quarterfinals)
  Yevgeny Kafelnikov (second round)
  Àlex Corretja (first round)
  Patrick Rafter (second round)
  Dominik Hrbatý (semifinals)
  Juan Carlos Ferrero (champion)
  Cédric Pioline (first round)

Draw

External links
 2001 Dubai Tennis Championships Draw

2001 Dubai Tennis Championships and Duty Free Women's Open
Singles